Wolfie the Seawolf is the mascot of the Stony Brook Seawolves, the athletic teams representing Stony Brook University, one of two public flagship universities in New York state. Wolfie is depicted as an anthropomorphic sea creature and was introduced in 1995 as the Stony Brook athletic program began its transition to the NCAA's Division I level, the highest in United States collegiate athletics.

History

Origin 
In 1995, Wolfie was selected as the choice for Stony Brook University's new mascot by a 32-person committee made up of students, alumni, faculty and administrators. Over 200 possible choices were in the running as Stony Brook University sought a new nickname and mascot for its transition to Division I. Since 1966, Stony Brook had competed as the Stony Brook Patriots at the Division III level.

Appearances in media 
In 2005, Wolfie beat up J.J. Jumper, the NCAA's official basketball mascot, during an America East tournament game.

Wolfie met Al Roker, a weatherman on NBC's Today show, during a live segment in 2008. Along with the Stony Brook University marching band, dance team and cheerleading team, Wolfie was featured in a 2010 episode of Extreme Makeover: Home Edition which highlighted in a home in East Setauket, New York. 

Wolfie was one of 17 college mascots to appear in a 2011 commercial for ESPN's College GameDay. Stony Brook was the only Football Championship Subdivision school represented by its mascot in the commercial.

In 2012, a video of Wolfie dancing to "U Can't Touch This" by MC Hammer was named "Web Video of the Day" by ESPN. 

Wolfie marched alongside the Stony Brook baseball team in the 2012 New York City Columbus Day Parade to commemorate the Seawolves' Cinderella run to the College World Series. Since 2014, Wolfie regularly marches with the Stony Brook dance team and marching band in the annual Columbus Day Parade.

On March 15, 2014, Wolfie was involved in a physical fight with Damien the Great Dane, the mascot for the Albany Great Danes, in the first half of the America East Championship game. The well-publicized altercation came as Stony Brook faced its longtime New York rival Albany with a bid to the NCAA Tournament on the line.

In 2020, Ryan Field, an Emmy-winning broadcaster for ABC's Eyewitness News, portrayed Wolfie in a segment.

Lore 
Wolfie was born on February 15, 1995. His height is 6 feet tall and he is a double major in marine biology and cheerleading.

The Seawolf is described as a mythical creature from the Tlingit tribe which brought good luck to those able to see it.

References

External links
 

College mascots in the United States
Stony Brook Seawolves